Joie Qu Ying (born July 2, 1971 in Changsha, Hunan) is a Chinese model and actress.

Life 
She graduated from the modern drama class at the Artistic School of Hunan, and later became a cast member in the Hunan Repertory Theatre. In 1990, she started working as a professional model as she joined a fashion show team in Beijing. Then she participated, and ended up as a runner-up, in the New Silk Road Chinese Modeling Competition()in 1991.

Modeling career 
After the modeling competition, Qu acted in a large number of television series and films. First in series "Plum Woman" in 1990, the most memorable ones are "Love Talks"() and its spinoff sequel, "Adieu". She also started her singing career when she released her debut album "Fly With Me" in 1994. She signed with music record company BMG in 1997 and released four other albums up to date.

Qu has been called "China's first generation of supermodel," and has represented international brands such as Pantene and Maybelline cosmetics.

In 2007, Qu agreed to take the host spot for China's Next Top Model (CNTM閃亮模坊), the Chinese version of American reality show America's Next Top Model.  When the show began, however, the producers, chose Chinese supermodel Li Ai to host the show.

Qu Ying is currently living happily in the town of Beijing, China.

Filmography
 Six Years, Six Days (2017)
 Are You Ready to Marry Me (2014)
 Mystery (2012)
 Car Embarrassed (2012)
 Black Ransom (2010)
 Call for Love (2007)
 Magazine Gap Road (2007)
 I'm Seducible (2006)
 The Twins Effect II (2004)
 Asian Charlie's Angels (2004) (TV series)
 Fascination Amour (1999)
 Keep Cool (1997)

References

External links 
 (in Chinese, English and Japanese)

1971 births
Living people
Chinese female models
Actresses from Hunan
People from Changde
Chinese film actresses
Chinese television actresses
20th-century Chinese actresses
21st-century Chinese actresses
Participants in Chinese reality television series
21st-century Chinese women singers